Metallosticha argyrogrammos is a species of snout moth. It is found in Italy, Greece, North Macedonia, Bulgaria and Romania.

References

Moths described in 1847
Phycitini
Moths of Europe
Moths of Asia